John Allison (August 5, 1812 – March 23, 1878) was an American politician, most notably serving in the U.S. House as a Representative of Pennsylvania during the 1850s.

Allison was born in Beaver, Pennsylvania and grew up to study law.  He was the son of James Allison, Jr.  He was admitted to the bar, but did not practice, instead establishing a hat factory. He served in the Pennsylvania House of Representatives in 1846, 1847, and 1849; he ran successfully for the U.S. House as a Whig in the 1850 election. He lost his bid for re-election in 1852, but won back the seat in 1854 as an Oppositionist. He then retired from the House in 1856.

After retiring from the House, he was active in the politics of the nascent Republican Party; he served as a delegate to their 1856 convention, where he nominated Abraham Lincoln for Vice President.

On April 3, 1869, Allison was appointed Register of the U.S. Treasury, a post he held until his death. He was interred in Beaver Cemetery.

References

External links
 The Political Graveyard

1812 births
1878 deaths
People from Beaver, Pennsylvania
Whig Party members of the United States House of Representatives from Pennsylvania
Opposition Party members of the United States House of Representatives from Pennsylvania
Pennsylvania Republicans
Members of the Pennsylvania House of Representatives
19th-century American politicians